St Joseph's Higher Secondary School is one of the schools of India located in Cuddalore, Tamil Nadu.

St Joseph's High School which was started in 1868. This school was elevated into a college in 1884 through the efforts of Father Tarbes and was affiliated to the University of Madras. The District - Gazetteer, Cuddalore District has recorded that the prime educational institution and the only college in the District in the 19th century was the St Joseph's College. It once again became a High School in 1909 due to the financial constraints.

Since then there have been several attempts to revitalize the college. The college was reborn as the St Joseph's College of Arts and Science in 1991. The college was inaugurated on 11 October 1991, at a stately function presided over by Bhishma Narain Singh, the then Governor of Tamil Nadu.

The School bears the Motto Labor omnia vincit, meaning "Hard work conquers all".

History
1852 The site "Colonel Garden" acquired by Mgr. Bonand, D.D. Vicar Apostolic of Pondy.
1868 Inauguration of St. Joseph's High School through the effort of Rev Father L Renevier, the First Principal.
1884 St Joseph's raised to the status of a Second Grade College with Humanities and Mathematics.
1909 Downgraded to the status of High School.
1957 St Joseph's Industrial School inaugurated.
1962 St Joseph's Hostel inaugurated.
1968 Completion of a century.
1969 Centenary celebrations
1979 Upgraded into a Higher Secondary School.
1982 St Joseph's Nursery School started.
1984 Sports Authority of India adopts the School for promotion of sports activities.
1988 Industrial School becomes Industrial Training Institute(I.T.I).
1991 St Joseph's College of Arts and Science inaugurated by Bhisma Narain Singh, Governor of Tamil Nadu.
1993 Completion of one Hundred and Twenty Five years.
1994 Post-Centennial Silver Jubilee Celebrations.

Principals
 Rev. Fr. L. Reneuvier 1868–1872
 Rev. Fr. Seegmuller 1872–1873
 Rev. Fr. Bottero 1873–1875
 Rev. Fr. Tarbes 1875–1888
 Rev. Fr. J. M. Bertho 1888–1895
 Rev. Fr. Durier 1895–1898
 Rev. Fr. J. M. Bertho 1898–1906
 Rev. Fr. P. Verdure 1906–1934
 Rev. Fr. Mirande 1934–1936
 Rev. Fr. P.A. Swamikannu Interim
 Rev. Fr. H. Escande 1937–1941
 Rev. Fr. H. Cailleauit 1942
 Rev. Fr. A.M. Gnanapragasam 1942–1961
 Rev. Fr. M. Peter 1961–1981
 Rev. Fr. R. Ratchagar 1981–1997
 Rev. Fr. G. Peter Rajendiran 1997–2002
 Rev. Fr. V. Aruldass 2002–2007
 Rev. Fr. V. Agnel 2007 -2013
 Rev. Fr. G. Peter Rajendiram 2013-2015
 Rev. Fr. P. Arul Nathan 2015-till date

Amenities
St. Joseph's High School has the following amenities:
 Playground (2 football, 2 hockey, 6 volleyball, 6 basketball, 2 badminton, 6 ko ko, 400 m track and many kabhaddi courts etc.)
 Gym
 Auditorium
 Library
 School buses
 Laboratories
 Biology
 Chemistry
 Computer Science
 Physics

Notable alumni
 Most Rev. Dr. Michael Augustine, Archbishop of Pondicherry and Cuddalore.
 Most Rev. Dr. Yvon Ambrose, Bishop of Tuticorin
 V. Vaithilingam, Former chief-minister of Pondicherry
 Ere. Elamvazhuthi, Member of Legislative Assembly (MLA) of the Cuddalore constituency of Tamil Nadu from 1967 to 1970 representing Dravida Munnetra Kazhagam (DMK)
 D. S. Amalorpavadass, a third-world theologian who played a vital role in the renewal of life and mission of the Roman Catholic Church in India.
 E. Pugazhendi alias Ela. Pugazhendi, politician and current head of the Students' Wing of DMK
 Duraisamy Simon Cardinal Lourdusamy, Indian cardinal of the Roman Catholic Church

References

Catholic secondary schools in India
Christian schools in Tamil Nadu
Primary schools in Tamil Nadu
High schools and secondary schools in Tamil Nadu
Education in Cuddalore district
Educational institutions established in 1868
1868 establishments in India